The 3rd China–Japan–Korea Friendship Athletic Meeting were held at the Gimcheon Stadium in Gimcheon, Korea on July 3, 2016.

Medal summary

Men

Women

Score table

Overall

Men

Women

Results

Men

100 meters
Prior to the competition, the records were as follows:

Final – 15:06 –

Wind: +1.6 m/s

400 meters
Prior to the competition, the records were as follows:

Final – 14:00 –

110 meters hurdles
Prior to the competition, the records were as follows:

Final – 15:24 –

Wind: +1.7 m/s

4 x 100 meters relay
Prior to the competition, the records were as follows:

Final – 16:28 –

4 x 400 meters relay
Prior to the competition, the records were as follows:

Final – 16:43 –

Pole vault
Prior to the competition, the records were as follows:

Final – 15:40 –

Long jump
Prior to the competition, the records were as follows:

Final – 14:50 –

Javelin throw
Prior to the competition, the records were as follows:

Final – 15:42 –

Women

200 meters
Prior to the competition, the records were as follows:

Final – 14:55 –

Wind: +0.7 m/s

800 meters
Prior to the competition, the records were as follows:

Final – 14:44 –

400 meters hurdles
Prior to the competition, the records were as follows:

Final – 14:30 –

4 x 100 meters relay
Prior to the competition, the records were as follows:

Final – 16:23 –

4 x 400 meters relay
Prior to the competition, the records were as follows:

Final – 16:36 –

High jump
Prior to the competition, the records were as follows:

Final – 15:00 –

Triple jump
Prior to the competition, the records were as follows:

Final – 16:10 –

Javelin throw
Prior to the competition, the records were as follows:

Final – 14:45 –

References 

Reports
(2016-07-05). 김천시, 2016 한중일친선육상대회 성료. Asia Today. Retrieved on 2016-07-07.
Results
Full results. KAAF. Retrieved on 2016-07-07.

External links
Korean Association of Athletics Federations

China-Japan-Korea Friendship Athletic Meeting
International athletics competitions hosted by South Korea
China–Japan–Korea Friendship Athletic Meeting